Ambanizana is a town and commune in Madagascar. It belongs to the district of Maroantsetra, which is a part of Analanjirofo Region. The population of the commune was estimated to be approximately 5,265 in 2018.

The village lies at the footpath leading around the Masoala peninsula and the footsteps to the Masoala National Park.

References and notes 

Populated places in Analanjirofo